The Roman Catholic Diocese of Fort Portal is a diocese located in the city of Fort Portal in the Ecclesiastical province of Mbarara in Uganda.

The Catholic Diocese of Fort Portal formerly belonging to Rwenzori Vicariate was erected on 2 July 1961, with Vincent Joseph McCauley† CSC, as its first bishop. He was succeeded in 1972 by Serapio Bwemi Magambo† who served the Diocese until 1991, when Paul Lokiru Kalanda† took over as the third Bishop of the Diocese. His successor, the current bishop, Robert Muhiirwa, was ordained and installed on 15 June 2003.

Bishops

This is a list of Bishops of Fort Portal (Roman rite)

 Vincent J. McCauley, C.S.C. (21 February 1961 – 16 November 1972)
 Serapio Bwemi Magambo (16 November 1972 – 17 June 1991)
 Paul Lokiru Kalanda (17 June 1991 – 18 March 2003)
 Robert Muhiirwa (since 18 March 2003)

Auxiliary Bishops
Joseph Mugenyi Sabiiti (1999-)
Serapio Bwemi Magambo (1969-1972), appointed Bishop here

Other priest of this diocese who became bishop
Francis Aquirinus Kibira, appointed Bishop of Kasese in 2014

References

External links
 GCatholic.org
 Catholic Hierarchy
Vincent McCauley: Bishop of the Poor, Apostle of East Africa Ave Maria Press (2008)

Roman Catholic dioceses in Uganda
Christian organizations established in 1961
Roman Catholic dioceses and prelatures established in the 20th century
Kabarole District
1961 establishments in Uganda
Roman Catholic Ecclesiastical Province of Mbarara